Highbury Union F.C., more usually simply known as Union, was an English association football club from Islington, founded in 1873 as a club playing both rugby football and association codes.  The club continued playing both codes until at least 1877, but by 1881 was solely an association club.

Although claiming a foundation date of 1873, the club's first external association rules match seems to have taken place in October 1875, against Prairie Rangers of Wormwood Scrubs.  The club competed in the FA Cup in 1876, losing 5-0 at Rochester, and scratched its entry in 1877 when drawn to face the Royal Engineers.  The club also took part in 1881 and 1882, but lost in the first round both times.

The club seems to have ceased to exist before the 1884-85 season, with many of its players (including captain Frank Webster) joining Romford.

Colours

The Charles Alcock football annuals list the club colours as the following.

References

Defunct football clubs in England